The River Triogue is a river that flows through the county of Laois in Ireland. It is a tributary of the River Barrow.

It has its source in the Cullenagh Hills, south of Portlaoise. It enters the town of Portlaoise from the south, passing under Main Street and flows north before joining the River Barrow at Clonterry north east of Mountmellick.

See also
Rivers of Ireland

References

External links
 libraryireland.com

Rivers of County Laois